Arbatan may refer to:
Arbatan, Nakhchivan, Azerbaijan
Arbatan, Salyan, Azerbaijan
Arbatan, Iran (disambiguation)